Dong-joo, also spelled Dong-ju, is a Korean unisex given name.
	 	
People with this name include:	
Yun Dong-ju (1917–1945), Korean poet
Kim Dong-joo (born 1976), South Korean baseball player

Fictional characters with this name include:
Han Dong-joo, in 2004 South Korean television series Stained Glass
Park Dong-joo, in 2010 South Korean television series My Girlfriend Is a Nine-Tailed Fox
Cha Dong-joo, in 2011 South Korean television series Can You Hear My Heart
Han Dong-joo, in 2011 South Korean television series Paradise Ranch
Kang Dong-joo, in 2012 South Korean film Never Ending Story
Park Dong-joo, in 2014 South Korean television series Angel Eyes
Dong Dong-joo, in 2019 South Korean television series The Tale of Nokdu

See also
List of Korean given names 	
	
Korean unisex given names